Domenico Sanguigni (27 June 1809 – 20 November 1882) was an Italian cardinal and apostolic nuncio.

References

1809 births
1882 deaths
19th-century Italian cardinals
Cardinals created by Pope Leo XIII
People from the Province of Latina